Ardian Gashi  (born 20 June 1981) is a Shqiptar retired footballer who played as a midfielder]. Gashi played for Molde, Vålerenga, Brann, Fredrikstad and Odd in the Norwegian top division, and Helsingborg in Allsvenskan.

Gashi is from Kosovo, but his family moved to Norway when he was eight years old. He became a Norwegian citizen, and has played for the Norway national team until 2014, when he started to play for Kosovo.

Club career
Gashi was born in Gjakova, SFR Yugoslavia but Gashi's family, who is of Albanian ethnicity, moved from Kosovo to Norway as refugees when he was eight years old. Gashi's family moved to Kyrksæterøra in Norway and he started to play football at the local club KIL/Hemne before he moved transferred to Molde in 1998. After a spell at Ørn Horten he went to Oslo to play for Vålerenga on loan in 2003, and later permanently.

Gashi was an important player in Vålerenga's good 2004 season, when the club finished as runners-up in the league.

In the 2005 season Gashi missed a number of games in August, due to having to serve a prison sentence for breaking the speed limits while driving. He was sentenced to 18 days in prison, but was released after 14, for good behavior, and thus managed to play in Vålerenga's 1–0 loss. He was later to play in the penalty shootout loss against Club Brugge in the last round of UEFA Champions League qualification.

On 30 August 2006, Gashi signed for Brann in a transfer worth about NOK 7.000.000. On 25 July 2007, he signed with Fredrikstad FK. It was announced in December 2009 that he would join Swedish club Helsingborgs IF for the 2010 season.

In Helsingborg he became somewhat of and icon to the club and in the 2011 season he formed a very successful central midfield partnership with May Mahlangu which was a key to Helsingborg won both the cup and the league. 

On 5 August 2014, he joined Odd, signing a contract until the summer of 2017.

International career
Gashi played 18 matches for the Norway U21 national team between 2002 and 2003, scoring two goals. He was later capped seven times for the senior team between 2004 and 2005, his last cap was the 2006 World Cup qualifying match against Belarus on 12 October 2005. In October 2012, Gashi was again called up for the national team squad, following Håvard Nordtveit's suspension ahead of the 2014 World Cup qualifying match against Cyprus Gashi started the match on the bench, but came on as a substitute for Magnus Wolff Eikrem after 89 minutes.

Even though Gashi has been capped for Norway, he has stated several times that his biggest dream is to represent Kosovo as a footballer. He has stated that, although he is ethnically Albanian, he would like to score against Albania in the qualifiers for the FIFA World Cup 2014, if he would be selected for the upcoming 2013 matches and would not follow the example of Granit Xhaka, another ethnic Albanian, playing for Switzerland, who graced Albania in their match against the Swiss.

Ahead of the friendly match against South Africa in January 2013, Gashi persuaded Egil "Drillo" Olsen to play with him as the holding midfielder, and Drillo praised Gashi's performance after the match.

Gashi switched to the Kosovar FA, and made an appearance for them in their first ever game against Haiti national football team in a 1–1 tie.

Career statistics

Honours 
Vålerenga
 Tippeligaen: 2005

Brann
 Tippeligaen: 2007

Helsingborg
 Allsvenskan: 2011
 Svenska Cupen: 2010, 2011
Supercupen: 2011, 2012

Individual
Kniksen award: midfielder of the year in 2004

References

External links 
 
 
 

1981 births
Living people
Sportspeople from Gjakova
People from Hemne
Refugees in Norway
Kosovan emigrants to Norway
Naturalised citizens of Norway
Association football midfielders
Kosovan footballers
Kosovo international footballers
Norwegian footballers
Norway international footballers
Norway under-21 international footballers
Dual internationalists (football)
Molde FK players
FK Ørn-Horten players
Vålerenga Fotball players
SK Brann players
Fredrikstad FK players
Helsingborgs IF players
Odds BK players
Eliteserien players
Norwegian First Division players
Norwegian Third Division players
Allsvenskan players
Norwegian expatriate footballers
Kosovan expatriate footballers
Expatriate footballers in Sweden
Norwegian expatriate sportspeople in Sweden
Kosovan expatriate sportspeople in Sweden
Kniksen Award winners